John McConnell Wolfe Jr. (born April 21, 1954) is an American attorney and perennial political candidate. He challenged President Barack Obama for the Democratic Party's 2012 presidential nomination. He ultimately emerged as the most successful challenger, receiving the second-highest number of delegates (23) and popular votes (116,639).

Political campaigns
Wolfe made an unsuccessful bid in 1998 for the Democratic congressional nomination in Tennessee's 3rd district. In 2001, he ran for Mayor of Chattanooga, Tennessee, and received 2.8% of the vote in that race, which was won by Bob Corker. In 2002, he lost a second congressional bid in the 3rd District to then-U.S. Representative Zach Wamp, and garnered 34% of the vote as the Democratic nominee. Wolfe faced Wamp again in a 2004 congressional rematch, and was again defeated, this time acquiring 33% of the vote. In 2007, he ran unsuccessfully in a special election for a Tennessee State Senate seat.

Wolfe was fined $10,000 in 2008 after he failed to file a fourth-quarter campaign finance disclosure report for his 2007 State Senate campaign with the state as required by law. In 2010, he ran for Congress in Tennessee's 3rd district, and lost to Chuck Fleischmann 57%-28%.

Wolfe has also made two runs for the Democratic presidential primaries, in 2012 and in 2016.

Congressional campaigns

1998 congressional campaign
In 1998 Wolfe ran, unsuccessfully, in the Democratic primary for Tennessee's 3rd congressional district.

2002 congressional campaign

In the 2002 race for Tennessee's 3rd district, Wolfe was the Democratic challenger to incumbent Republican Zach Wamp. Wolfe ultimately lost to Wamp.

Below is the result of the general election

2004 congressional campaign

In 2004 Wolfe again was nominated to run against Wamp for Tennessee's 3rd congressional district. Wolfe lost again. Wolfe, however, was able to garner a greater number of votes but a smaller percent of the vote in 2004 than he had in 2002.

Below is the result of the general election

Campaign finances
Detailed below are the FEC-filed finances of his 2004 congressional campaign committee as of 12/31/2008

2010 congressional campaign

In 2010 Wolfe again ran for Congress in Tennessee's 3rd congressional district. He ultimately lost to Chuck Fleischmann 57% to 28%.

Wolfe faced three other candidates for the Democratic nomination. The three other candidates on the August 2010 Democratic primary ballots were Alicia Mitchel of Oak Ridge, Brenda Freeman Short of East Ridge, and Brent Staton of Chattanooga. Several candidates had dropped-out ahead of the primary, including Tom Humphrey, Paula Flowers of Oak Ridge (a former member of Governor Phil Bredesen's cabinet), and Brent Benedict (who was the 2006 Democratic nominee for the 3rd district).

Below is the result of the general election:

Presidential campaigns

2012 presidential campaign

Platform

Wolfe supports a return to the Glass-Steagall Act to separate speculative activity from commercial banking. He favors the use of Anti-Trust Laws to reduce the size of "megabanks," and proposes a tax on financial derivatives. He also proposes an "Alternate Federal Reserve" which would loan to community banks, small business, and individuals, as opposed to the Federal Reserve Bank, which, Wolfe contends, serves primarily the interests of the six largest banks. Wolfe is also a critic of the Affordable Care Act, saying that it is oriented primarily toward helping the insurance and pharmaceutical companies. Instead, he supports Medicare for All.

Reception
Wolfe took part in the New Hampshire "lesser known candidates forum" in December 2011. He qualified for the ballot in the New Hampshire Democratic primary, in which he received 246 votes, 0.4% of the vote total. In addition to New Hampshire, he qualified for presidential primary ballots in the states of Missouri, Louisiana and Arkansas.

In the Louisiana primary, Wolfe polled 11.83% which qualified him to earn a minimum of three delegates to the 2012 Democratic National Convention. Following the primary, officials of the Democratic Party of Louisiana announced that Wolfe was ineligible for the delegates he had apparently won because, according to the party officials, Wolfe had not properly complied with the party's qualification requirements. In response, Wolfe filed a lawsuit against the party, disputing the claim that he did not qualify to receive the delegates.

Following incumbent President Barack Obama's narrower-than-expected primary win in West Virginia, where convicted felon Keith Russell Judd finished a strong second as a protest vote, press began to speculate on the possibility of Wolfe, who lacks Judd's criminal record, possibly contending and even winning the state of Arkansas. A poll conducted by Hendrix College of Democrats in Arkansas's 4th congressional district showed Wolfe within seven points of Obama there. Wolfe finished second in that primary, garnering 41.6% of the vote. He filed a legal action to have delegates seated at the 2012 Democratic National Convention.

Wolfe contested the Texas Democratic primary, garnering 5.05 percent of the vote, winning one county (Borden County) and tying in another (Sherman County). No delegates were at stake in the contest.

Wolfe lost his court case one week before the convention, and as a result, neither he nor any other candidates other than Obama had their delegates seated.

After Wolfe lost the primary, his name appeared on the ballot in Idaho without his knowledge, Despite this, he did not attain any votes

Below is a table of the results of primary competitions he competed in during the Democratic primaries.

2016 presidential campaign

In November 2015, Wolfe filed for the Arkansas presidential primary.

Below is a table of the results of primary competitions he competed in during the Democratic primaries.

Senate campaign
John Wolfe also announced a run for the United States Senate representing Tennessee on a platform of universal healthcare, increasing the minimum wage, the protection and expansion of social security and withdrawing from Syria. He was interviewed on two E Pluribus Unum's Fireside Chats, a Political podcast run by the YouTube Channel E Pluribus Unum

Results

Personal life

Wolfe resides in Chattanooga, Tennessee.

References

External links
John Wolfe for America, official 2012 campaign site 
Extremely Unofficial John Wolfe Jr. for President 2012 Page

Living people
Politicians from Chattanooga, Tennessee
Tennessee Democrats
Tennessee lawyers
Candidates in the 2012 United States presidential election
21st-century American politicians
Candidates in the 2016 United States presidential election
Candidates in the 2018 United States Senate elections
1954 births